Paul Harland (15 April 1960 – 17 June 2003) was the pseudonym of the Dutch science fiction writer Paul Smit. He wrote several novels, one in English, and one of his collections was translated into English. Along with his writing he also designed furniture.

Death
His death had initially been reported as a suicide. Later his husband, Bosnian architect Tarik Dreca, was convicted for his murder. Tarik had apparently staged the death to make it look like a suicide. Tarik's defense attorney theorized that Harland had recreated a plot from his book The Hand That Takes, which has a man commit suicide and set up his partner, but the court rejected the idea.
In 2006 Tarik was sentenced to twelve years for the murder.

Awards
Four times, Harland won the King Kong Award, the major Dutch award for short science fiction, fantasy or horror stories, for "Fuga in frictieloos porcelein" (1984), "De wintertuin" (1990), "Retrometheus" (1992), and "Onkruid en stenen" (1995). After his death the King Kong Award was renamed the Paul Harland Prize in his honor.

Bibliography
 Novels
De val van Nieuw Versailles (Stichting Fantastische Vertellingen, 1983)
De bleke schaduw van de vrouwe (with Tais Teng) (Stichting Fantastische Vertellingen, 1988)
Water tot ijs (Babel, 1994) 
Systems of Romance (with Paul Evenblij) (Babel, 1995) 
Computercode Cthulhu (with Tais Teng)  (Babel - One Door Publications, 2005) 
The Hand That Takes (Aeon Press, 2002) 
 Collections of short stories
Remote Control (Babel, 1993) 
''De werelden van Vince-Crux (Babel - One Door Publications, 2005) 
 Another 15 unbundled stories, published between 1980 and 1998

References

External links
 Bibliography
 "Murder mystery scenario 1" (Web Archive Recovery)

1960 births
2003 deaths
Dutch science fiction writers
Dutch gay writers
20th-century novelists
20th-century Dutch male writers
20th-century Dutch LGBT people